Westgate Shopping Centre is a shopping mall in the Carlington neighbourhood of Ottawa, Ontario, Canada. It is located southwest of downtown, bordering Carling Avenue, Merivale Road, and Highway 417, owned by RioCan Real Estate Investment Trust.

The mall opened May 12, 1955, and is considered Ottawa's first shopping centre. The anchor of the mall was Freiman's department store, owned by Lawrence Freiman who already had a department store on Rideau Street. In advertising for its grand opening, Westgate boasted that it had parking for over 1200 cars, weather-protected shopping and music for its customers. Other stores included Steinberg's, Tip Top Tailors, a movie theater, Reitmans, Kiddytown and a branch of Royal Bank of Canada. The Royal Bank is the only remaining original tenant.

The mall is served by OC Transpo routes 55, 80, 81 and 85.

A proposed redevelopment plans to have the mall demolished and replaced in phases with high-rise commercial and residential buildings. The first phase began in November 2019 with the demolition of Monkey Joe's Restaurant on the south-east corner of the property.

References

External links
 

Shopping malls in Ottawa
Shopping malls established in 1955
1955 establishments in Ontario